"Get My Party On" is a song recorded by Jamaican-American reggae artist Shaggy. It was written by him alongside Dave Kelly, Ricardo Ducent and Christopher Birch for his sixth studio album Lucky Day (2002), with Birch producing the song and Chaka Khan having featured vocals. The song was released as the album's third international single in 2003 and became a top 20 hit in Germany.

Track listing

Notes
 denotes remix producer
 denotes additional remix producer

Charts

References

Shaggy (musician) songs
2003 singles
Reggae songs
MCA Records singles
2002 songs
Songs written by Shaggy (musician)